Sir Maurice Eugene Casey (28 August 1923 – 19 January 2012) was a New Zealand Court of Appeal judge.

Biography
Casey was born in Christchurch in 1923. His parents were Eugene and Beatrice Casey. He received his education at St Patrick's College in Wellington, and at Victoria University College (1940–1946) from where he graduated LLM (Hons).

Casey was admitted to the bar in 1946 and practised in Lower Hutt, Blenheim, and from 1950 in Auckland. He was appointed as a judge in 1974 at the Supreme Court, which became the High Court in 1980. He became a household name in New Zealand when his injunction prevented the planned All Blacks tour to South Africa in 1985. Instead, an unofficial tour by a team known as the New Zealand Cavaliers took place in 1986.

In March 1986, Casey was appointed to the Court of Appeal, and the same year he was appointed privy counsellor. He retired from the Court of Appeal in August 1995. After his retirement, he sat on appellate courts of various Pacific Island nations. He was part of the Fijian Court of Appeal that found that the interim government installed after the 2000 Fijian coup d'état was unconstitutional.

He married Stella Katherine Wright in 1948, and the pair had nine or ten children. His wife was appointed a Dame Commander of the Order of the British Empire for services to the community in the 1991 New Year Honours. Casey himself was made a Knight Bachelor six months later in the 1991 Queen's Birthday Honours. He was awarded the Queen Elizabeth II Silver Jubilee Medal in 1977, and the New Zealand 1990 Commemoration Medal in 1990.

Casey died in Auckland on 19 January 2012, his wife having predeceased him in 2000.

References

1923 births
2012 deaths
Court of Appeal of New Zealand judges
People from Auckland
People educated at St. Patrick's College, Wellington
Victoria University of Wellington alumni
New Zealand Knights Bachelor
New Zealand judges on the courts of Fiji
Members of the Judicial Committee of the Privy Council
New Zealand members of the Privy Council of the United Kingdom